Star International is a weekly English language newspaper published in Northern Cyprus. It was formed from two separate newspapers, Cyprus Star and Turkey Star, both published weekly and owned by the Star Kibris Media Group. It was started in April 2008 and the current editor is Dan Gibson.

References

External links 
 Star International website www.starint.net  
 ADA TV website www.adatv.tv 

English-language newspapers published in Europe
Weekly newspapers
Newspapers published in Northern Cyprus
Publications established in 2008